The 46th New Zealand Parliament was a term of the New Zealand Parliament. Its composition was determined by the 1999 election, and it sat until the 2002 election.

The 46th Parliament marked a change of government, with a coalition of the Labour Party and the Alliance taking office. Helen Clark replaced Jenny Shipley as Prime Minister. The National Party, which had formed a minority government for the last part of the 45th Parliament, became the largest opposition party, eventually emerging under a new leader, Bill English. Other parties in Parliament were ACT, the Greens, New Zealand First, and United. Several parties represented at the end of the previous Parliament, such as Mauri Pacific, were wiped out, failing to retain any of their seats.

The 46th Parliament consisted of one hundred and twenty representatives. Sixty-seven of these representatives were chosen by geographical electorates, including six Māori electorates. The remainder were elected by means of party-list proportional representation under the Mixed Member Proportional (MMP) electoral system.

Electoral boundaries for the 46th Parliament

Overview of seats
The table below shows the number of MPs in each party following the 1999 election and at dissolution:

Notes
The Working Government majority is calculated as all Government MPs less all other parties.
 The Green Party entered a confidence and supply agreement with the Labour-Alliance coalition

Initial composition of the 46th Parliament
46th New Zealand Parliament - MPs elected to Parliament

List MPs are ordered by allocation as determined by the Chief Electoral Office and the party lists.

Changes during term
There were no by-elections held during the term of the 46th Parliament.
Don McKinnon, a National Party list MP, left Parliament in March 2000 to become Secretary-General of the Commonwealth. He was replaced by Arthur Anae, the next candidate on the National Party list.
Simon Upton, a National Party list MP, left Parliament in January 2001. He was replaced by Alec Neill, the next candidate on the National Party list.

Seating plan

Start of term 
The chamber is in a horseshoe-shape.

References

New Zealand parliaments